Pheucticus is a genus of grosbeaks containing six species.

The genus was introduced by the German naturalist Ludwig Reichenbach in 1850. The type species was subsequently designated as the black-backed grosbeak.

Species
The name of the genus is from the Ancient Greek φευκτικός - pheuktikós "shy" or "inclined to avoid".

References

 
Bird genera
Grosbeaks
Taxa named by Ludwig Reichenbach